A rough cut is a stage of film editing in which the film begins to resemble its final product.

Rough Cut or Rough Cuts may also refer to the following:

 Rough cut, a stage of the audio mastering process
 Rough cut, the practice of intentionally leaving the edges of the pages of a book or other publication in a rough "unfinished" state, as in a deckle edge
 Rough Cut (1980 film), an American film directed by Don Siegel
 Rough Cut (2008 film), a South Korean film directed by Jang Hoon
 Rough Cut, a 2007 album by Hadiqa Kiani
 Rough Cut Comics, a Scottish comic book publisher
 Rough Cuts (radio series), a blog and podcast published by National Public Radio
 Rough Cuts (TV series), a Canadian television series presenting documentary films
 Rough Cutt, an American heavy metal band or their eponymous first album
 Rough Cut with Fine Woodworking, an American television show produced by WGBH Educational Foundation